Zachariah Simmons was an underworld figure involved in running policy games in New York during the late 19th century. Supported by the Tweed Ring, he took over the policy rackets from Reuben Parsons and John Frink following the end of the American Civil War. He would run three-fourths of the city's six or seven hundred policy operations and eventually held interests as far away as Milwaukee and Richmond. He would eventually retire during the 1880s and turned control over to one of his runners, Albert J. Adams who would continue to run Simmons' policy games until the reform movements during the 1910s.

Further reading
Cornell Law Project. The Development of the Law of Gambling: 1776-1976. Washington, DC: National Institute of Law Enforcement and Criminal Justice, 1977.
Hyde, Stephen and Geno Zanetti (ed.) Players: Con Men, Hustlers, Gamblers and Scam Artists. New York: Thunder's Mouth Press, 2002. 

Year of birth missing
Year of death missing
Criminals from New York City
Numbers game